Emile Michael Meola (October 19, 1905 – September 1, 1976) was a pitcher in Major League Baseball who played between the 1933 and 1936 seasons. He was born in New York City.

Career
Meola started his baseball career in 1928 with the Chambersburg Maroons of the Class D Blue Ridge League.  He pitched six years in the minor leagues before joining the Boston Red Sox in 1933.

In 1934, Meola enjoyed one of the best seasons ever for a pitcher in minor league history, after going 20–5 with a 2.90 ERA for the Los Angeles Angels of the Pacific Coast League. The next year he finished with a 19–8 mark. He divided his playing time between the St. Louis Browns and Boston Red Sox in 1936, his last major league season.

Records
In a three-year majors career, Meola posted a 0–3 record with 15 strikeouts and an 8.16 ERA in 18 appearances, including three starts, one complete game, one save, and 43.0 innings of work. He also spent more than a decade in the minors, pitching for the Charlotte, Jersey City, Toronto and Syracuse teams, among others. Following his baseball retirement in 1939, he worked as a demolition contractor in New York.

Death
A resident of Fair Lawn, New Jersey, Meola died there at age 70.

References

Sources
 1934 Los Angeles Angels
Baseball Reference
Deadball Era
Retrosheet

Boston Red Sox players
St. Louis Browns players
Chambersburg Maroons players
Hagerstown Hubs players
Major League Baseball pitchers
Baseball players from New York (state)
1905 births
1976 deaths
People from Fair Lawn, New Jersey